The Cape May Peninsula AVA is an American Viticultural Area located in extreme southern New Jersey. The  wine appellation includes most of Cape May county and a small portion of Cumberland county. The region is characterized by well-drained sandy or sandy loam soils of low to moderate fertility, and a relatively long growing season. The climate is strongly moderated by the influence of the Atlantic Ocean and Delaware Bay. The region is in hardiness zones 6b, 7a, and 7b. The AVA is entirely contained within the larger Outer Coastal Plain AVA, but is distinguished from it primarily by a more moderate temperature, providing for a longer growing season.

Boundary 
The Federal Register describes the Cape May Peninsula AVA as having the following boundaries:
(1) The beginning point is on the Ocean City quadrangle at the intersection of the 10-foot elevation contour and the Garden State Parkway, on the southern shore of Great Egg Harbor, northwest of Golders Point. Proceed southeast, then generally southwest along the meandering 10-foot elevation contour, crossing onto the Marmora quadrangle, then onto the Sea Isle City quadrangle, to the intersection of the 10-foot elevation contour with an unnamed road known locally as Sea Isle Boulevard; then
(2) Proceed northwesterly along Sea Isle Boulevard to the intersection of the road with U.S. Highway 9; then
(3) Proceed southwesterly along U.S. Highway 9 to the intersection of the highway with the 10-foot elevation contour south of Magnolia Lake; then
(4) Proceed generally southwesterly along the meandering 10-foot elevation contour, crossing onto the Woodbine quadrangle, then briefly back onto the Sea Isle City quadrangle, then back onto the Woodbine quadrangle, to the intersection of the 10-foot elevation contour with the western span of the Garden State Parkway east of Clermont; then
(5) Proceed southwest along the Garden State Parkway to the intersection of the road with Uncle Aarons Creek; then
(6) Proceed westerly (upstream) along Uncle Aarons Creek to the intersection of the creek with the 10-foot elevation contour near the headwaters of the creek; then
(7) Proceed easterly, then southwesterly along the 10-foot elevation contour, crossing onto the Stone Harbor quadrangle, then onto the northwesternmost corner of the Wildwood quadrangle, then onto Cape May quadrangle, to the intersection of the 10-foot elevation contour with State Route 109 and Benchmark (BM) 8, east of Cold Spring; then
(8) Proceed southeast, then south, along State Route 109 to the intersection of the road with the north bank of the Cape May Canal; then
(9) Proceed northwest along the north bank of the Cape May Canal to the intersection of the canal with the railroad tracks (Pennsylvania Reading Seashore Lines); then
(10) Proceed south along the railroad tracks, crossing the canal, to the intersection of the railroad tracks with the south bank of the Cape May Canal; then
(11) Proceed east along the canal bank to the intersection of the canal with Cape Island Creek; then
(12) Proceed south, then northwest along the creek to the intersection of the creek with a tributary running north-south west of an unnamed road known locally as 1st Avenue; then
(13) Proceed north along the tributary to its intersection with Sunset Boulevard; then
(14) Proceed northwest along Sunset Boulevard to the intersection of the road with Benchmark (BM) 6; then
(15) Proceed south in a straight line to the shoreline; then
(16) Proceed west, then northwest, then northeast along the shoreline, rounding Cape May Point, and continuing northeasterly along the shoreline, crossing onto the Rio Grande quadrangle, then onto the Heislerville quadrangle, to the intersection of the shoreline with West Creek; then
(17) Proceed generally north along the meandering West Creek, passing through Pickle Factory Pond and Hands Millpond, and continuing along West Creek, crossing onto the Port Elizabeth quadrangle, and continuing along West Creek to the fork in the creek north of Wrights Crossway Road; then
(18) Proceed along the eastern fork of West Creek to the cranberry bog; then
(19) Proceed through the cranberry bog and continue northeasterly along the branch of West Creek that exits the cranberry bog to the creek's terminus south of an unnamed road known locally as Joe Mason Road; then
(20) Proceed northeast in a straight line to Tarkiln Brook Tributary; then
(21) Proceed easterly along Tarkiln Brook Tributary, passing through the cranberry bog, crossing onto the Tuckahoe quadrangle, and continuing along Tarkiln Brook tributary to its intersection with the Tuckahoe River and the Atlantic-Cape May County line; then
(22) Proceed easterly along the Atlantic-Cape May County line, crossing onto the Marmora and Cape May quadrangles, to the intersection of the Atlantic-Cape May County line with the Garden State Parkway on the Cape May quadrangle; then

(23) Proceed south along the Garden State Parkway, returning to the beginning point.

Wineries 
, there are 7 wineries in the Cape May Peninsula AVA. Most of the wineries in this AVA are also members of the Outer Coastal Plain Vineyard Association, an industry trade organization "dedicated to the establishment and promotion of sustainable and economically viable viticulture in the Outer Coastal Plain AVA of New Jersey."

 Cape May Winery & Vineyard in North Cape May
 G&W Winery in Rio Grande
 Hawk Haven Vineyard & Winery in Rio Grande
 Jessie Creek Winery in Dias Creek
 Natali Vineyards in Goshen
 Turdo Vineyards & Winery in North Cape May
 Willow Creek Winery in West Cape May

See also 

 Alcohol laws of New Jersey
 Central Delaware Valley AVA
 Garden State Wine Growers Association
 Judgment of Princeton
 List of wineries, breweries, and distilleries in New Jersey
 New Jersey Farm Winery Act
 New Jersey wine
 New Jersey Wine Industry Advisory Council
 Outer Coastal Plain AVA
 Warren Hills AVA

References

External links 

 Garden State Wine Growers Association
 Outer Coastal Plain Vineyard Association

American Viticultural Areas
Geography of New Jersey
New Jersey wine
2018 establishments in New Jersey